Thomas Couland Ross (14 February 1872 – 2 January 1947) was an Irish cricketer. He was a right-handed batsman and right-arm off-break bowler.

He made his debut for Ireland in July 1894 against South Africa, and went on to play for Ireland on 20 occasions. His last match was against Scotland in July 1910. Nine of his matches for Ireland had first-class status, his other first-class game was for the Gentlemen in the first Gentlemen v Players match of 1902.

References

External links
CricketEurope Stats Zone profile

1872 births
1947 deaths
Irish cricketers
Cricketers from Belfast
Gentlemen cricketers
Cricketers from Northern Ireland